Stina Ulrika Karlsson (born 27 April 1961) is a Swedish cross-country skier. She competed in two events at the 1984 Winter Olympics. Her daughter Linn Sömskar, is a cross-country skier.

Cross-country skiing results
All results are sourced from the International Ski Federation (FIS).

Olympic Games

World Cup

Season standings

References

External links
 

1961 births
Living people
Swedish female cross-country skiers
Olympic cross-country skiers of Sweden
Cross-country skiers at the 1984 Winter Olympics
People from Skellefteå Municipality
20th-century Swedish women